The High Commissioner of Malaysia to the United Kingdom of Great Britain and Northern Ireland is the head of Malaysia's diplomatic mission to the United Kingdom. The position has the rank and status of an Ambassador Extraordinary and Plenipotentiary and is based in the High Commission of Malaysia, London.

List of heads of mission

High Commissioners to the United Kingdom

See also 
 Malaysia–United Kingdom relations

References 

 
United Kingdom
Malaysia